Drighlington is a civil parish in the metropolitan borough of the City of Leeds, West Yorkshire, England.  It contains twelve listed buildings that are recorded in the National Heritage List for England.  Of these, one is listed at Grade I, the highest of the three grades, and the others are at Grade II, the lowest grade.  The parish contains the village of Drighlington and the surrounding countryside.  Most of the listed buildings are houses, and the others include farm buildings, a restaurant and associated former stable block, a church, a former school, and a milestone.


Key

Buildings

References

Citations

Sources

 

Lists of listed buildings in West Yorkshire